Mikkel Emil (Mikko Eemeli) Aakula (June 12, 1879 – July 26, 1955) was a Finnish politician. He was a member of the Centre Party (Finland) from 1930 to 1936 in Turku North Constituency. Aakula worked as land surveyors, farmers and Kokemäki a member of parliament after the term of Kokemäki a municipal treasurer and the municipal Kokemäki Board. He received the honorary title kunnallisneuvos in 1952. He died in Kokemäki.

References

1879 births
1955 deaths
People from Kokemäki
People from Turku and Pori Province (Grand Duchy of Finland)
Centre Party (Finland) politicians
Members of the Parliament of Finland (1930–33)
Members of the Parliament of Finland (1933–36)